Prionapteryx phaeomesa is a moth in the family Crambidae. It is found in Tanzania.

References

Endemic fauna of Tanzania
Ancylolomiini
Moths described in 1919